Ed Penniman is an American painter and graphic designer best known for his oil and watercolor paintings of the California's Central Coast.  The AIGA (American Institute of Graphic Arts) selected his book design as one the 50 best designed book covers of the year and he has won numerous awards for his paintings and designs. He was commissioned by Santa Cruz County to design the official County flag in 1983.
  
His designs and art work have been featured in magazines in the US, Europe, and Japan.  Penniman authored, You Are Up to You, a book documenting his near-death experience and recovery from Guillain–Barré syndrome, which left him a quadriplegic for three years.

Early Life and Career
Edward George Penniman was born (May 12, 1942) in Santa Cruz, California to parents Warren and Irene (née Costella) Penniman, Sr.  His father, Warren Penniman, was the owner of Penniman Title in Santa Cruz.   He is of Italian and English decent.  Penniman's grandmother, Leonora (née Naylor) Penniman (also a well-known artist), began teaching him watercolors when he was seven years old.  His grandfather, TF Costella, was contracted to do the cement work for the Giant Dipper in Santa Cruz in 1924.

Penniman graduated from Chouinard Art Institute with a Bachelor of Fine Arts degree.  In 1965, he was an art director at Ogilvy Advertising Agency (formerly Carson-Roberts) art directing print and TV advertising for Baskin-Robbins, Singer, and Mattel, among others.

Career

Penniman rose to prominence as an artist in the early 1970s winning awards for his unique graphic design and artwork.  He founded Ed Penniman and Associates, Advertising Design in Santa Cruz where he designed award-winning art and graphics for wineries, the Santa Cruz Symphony, the Santa Cruz Beach Boardwalk, the Cabrillo Festival of Contemporary Music, and others.

Penniman's work has been featured in Communication Arts Magazine, Graphic Elements of the World, Volume 1, and The Book of American Trademarks, among others.

His book design for Planet Steward Journal of a Wildlife Sanctuary Book Cover was included in the 50 Best Book Designs of the Year by the American Institute of Graphic Arts and he was awarded a Gold Medal at the Orange County Fair for his design of Bargetto Winery's wine label.  Penniman was commissioned by Santa Cruz County to design their official flag which was adopted by the Board of Supervisors on July 4, 1983 and he has won numerous awards.

In 1984, at 42 years old, Penniman was diagnosed with Guillain-Barré Syndrome, a nerve disorder that paralyzed him and left him a quadriplegic for three years. During his rehabilitation, Penniman was given an easel and paints.   He could only move his head so he learned to use his mouth to hold his paint brushes.  He slowly regained the use of his arms and legs and followed the artist trail of Winslow Homer throughout the island of Eleuthera as well as following Paul Gauguin's artist path to Tahiti, Moorea, and Rarotonga. His paintings have been featured in numerous exhibitions and publications.

Penniman is the former President of the Santa Cruz Art League and the curator of the California Statewide Landscape Exhibition, one of the longest-running art exhibitions in California. The annual Landscape Exhibition at the Art League was originated by his grandmother, Leonora Penniman in 1926.

Awards and Recognitions
 1969 - Certificate of Distinction - Packaging Design/Wine Label Design - San Francisco Art Directors Club
 1973 - Gold Medal - Wine Label Design - Bargetto Winery - Orange County Fair
 1973 - Gold Award Best of Show - (ITCA) International Typographic Composition Association
 1975 - 50 Best Book Designs of the Year  - Planet Steward Journal of a Wildlife Sanctuary Book Cover - American Institute of Graphic Arts
 1983 - Design of the Santa Cruz County Flag - Flags of the World
 1991 - Silver Award - Natural History Museum of Santa Cruz Artwork - Monterey Advertising Association 
 2004 -  2 Silver Awards, 1 Bronze Award - Brand Identity, Corporate Identity, Business to Business Advertising - Beacon Awards presented by the Northern California Chapter of the Business Marketing Association 
 2020 - Voted Best Artist in Santa Cruz County by Good Times Newspaper

Publications
 1971 - Featured Design, Packaging Design Magazine
 1972 - Ed Penniman Trademark Designs, The Book of American Trademarks
 1973 - Communications Arts Magazine - 6-page feature article
 1986 - 38 Examples of Design work by Ed Penniman, Graphic Elements of the World, Volume 1 (Japan) 
 1986 - The History Behind the Santa Cruz Dukes of Rock and Roll - Hip Santa Cruz, Volume 3
 2008 - You Are Up to You
 2018 - Catamaran Literary Reader

References

Painters from California
American graphic designers
Artists from California
20th-century American painters
21st-century American painters

1942 births

Living people